

St Matthew Island is a phantom island once thought to lie roughly one thousand kilometers northeast of Ascension Island in the Atlantic Ocean.  It appeared on navigational charts until as late as the early twentieth century. It was supposedly located at approximately 2°S 8°W, and was alleged to have been discovered by the Portuguese on St. Matthew's Day 1516.  It was shown and named on several maps going back to the beginning of the sixteenth century, and it was supposedly visited by García Jofre de Loaísa on 20 October 1525 while on a voyage to the Moluccas. It appeared on early Portuguese charts and world maps, and appears on Ortelius' 1570 map of the African continent Africae Tabula Nova. It thereafter regularly featured on charts and maps, and though it began to disappear from standard charts starting in the early nineteenth century, it was not completely removed from charts until the early twentieth century.

Peter Mundy refers in 1656 to St Matthew Island when writing about Ascension, with some words changed to be more understandable in brackets:

Captain James Cook tried but failed to find St. Matthew in 1775 during his second voyage.

Both Peter Leonard (1833) and H.C. Adams (1883) suggest that the error may have arisen from a confusion with Annobón Island, which lies at the same latitude but at 5°38′E longitude.

Gallery

See also 
 Saxemberg Island
 Thompson Island (South Atlantic)

References

External links 
 1829 French map showing "I. S. Mathieu"
 Thomas Bradford's 1835 map showing "St Mattheus"

Phantom islands of the Atlantic
Islands of the South Atlantic Ocean